The 64th Cavalry Division of the United States Army Organized Reserve was created from the perceived need for additional cavalry units. It numbered in succession of the Regular Army Divisions, which were not all active at its creation.  
The 64th Cavalry Division was dispersed across the United States. The division was composed of personnel from Kentucky, Massachusetts, Vermont, New Hampshire and West Virginia.

Lieutenant Colonel Steven Clay writes that the division was "constituted 15 October 1921, allotted to the First and Fifth Corps  Areas, and assigned to the Fifth Army. The division [headquarters] was initiated 22 October 1921 at the Post Office Building in Lexington, KY, by Lt. Col. Richard W. Walker. The division HQ was moved to Louisville, KY, on 14 March 1922 to provide a more central location for ..the cavalry units in the Fifth Corps Area. On official activation, the division began to flourish rapidly. By the end of 1922, the division was 62 percent complete. By 1926, the 64th Cav. Div. boasted 336 officers and 47 enlisted men and all authorized units had been activated."

"Due to the lack of horses, equipment, and enlisted men, the 64th Cav. Div. did not participate in the [1937] Second Army maneuver as an organized division. Instead, the members of the division (minus the 158th Brigade) reinforced [Regular Army or National Guard] units to bring them up to wartime strength in officers or by acting as umpires. In general, elements of the division reinforced the 7th and 54th Cav. Brigs., which participated in the Fifth Corps Area portion of the maneuvers held at Fort Knox. In all, over 200 officers from the division participated. The next major event for the division was the Second Army maneuver held in central Wisconsin in August 1940. This time, the officers of the 64th reinforced the 1st Sq., 14th Cav., but also provided a substantial number of officers to the 38th Div. as well. The 1940 maneuver in Wisconsin was the division’s last major training event, for although the 64th was not officially disbanded until [30] January 1942, it had almost ceased to exist by then. Most of the assigned personnel had already been called to Active Duty, leaving only a shell of the former organizations."

Structure 

 Headquarters & Headquarters Troop
 157th Brigade
 313th Cavalry Regiment
 314th Cavalry Regiment
 158th Brigade
 315th Cavalry Regiment 
 316th Cavalry Regiment 
 864th Field Artillery Regiment
 464th Tank Company
 64th Signal Troop
 584th Ordnance Company
 464th Quartermaster Squadron
 464th Armored Car Squadron
 404th Engineer Squadron
 364th Medical Squadron

References

Sources
 
 Maneuver and Firepower, The Evolution of Divisions and Separate Brigades, by John B. Wilson, Center of Military History, Washington D.C., 1998
 Cavalry Regiments of the U S Army by James A. Sawicki Wyvern Pubns; June 1985

64
Military units and formations established in 1921
Military units and formations disestablished in 1942